Lalli may refer to:
Hardiljeet Singh 'Lalli' (1932 - 2014), Punjabi literary scholar  
Lalli, an apocryphal character from Finnish history
Lalli, Rapla County, village in Kehtna Parish, Rapla County, Estonia
Lalli, Tartu County, village in Kambja Parish, Tartu County, Estonia
Lalli, Saare County, village in Muhu Parish, Saare County, Estonia

See also
Lali (disambiguation)